Robin Ciric (born 8 February 1997) is a Dutch kickboxer currently competing in the welterweight division. He is the former Enfusion 80 kg champion.

He is ranked as the eighth best welterweight in the world by Combat Press as of September 2022, and the ninth best by Beyond Kick as of October 2022. He first entered the Combat Press rankings in November 2021.

Kickboxing career
In December of 2019, Ciric fought under the banner of the Fighters Glory promotion, where he faced the WMO champion Samih Mimouni. Ciric won the fight by a second round knockout.

At Enfusion 83, Ciric fought Vladimír Moravčík for the Enfusion -80kg title. He defeated Moravčík by a fourth round TKO. Ciric fought three more non-title bouts in 2019, scoring knockouts of Mbamba Cauwenbergh, Giuseppe De Domenico and Samih Mimouni.

He was scheduled to fight Jeroen van Diemen on September 19th in a non-title fight and will defend his 80 kg title against Mohammed Ghaedibardeh in November of 2020. Ghaedibardeh was unable to travel due to travel restrictions caused by the COVID-19 pandemic, and was replaced by Lofti Amri. He defeated Jeroen van Diemen by unanimous decision. His planned title defense was postponed because of restrictions related to the COVID-19 pandemic.

Ciric was scheduled for a welterweight bout against Florin Lambagiu on December 15, 2021 at Dynamite Fighting Show 13: Night of Champions. However, the fight was cancelled two weeks before taking place as Ciric tested positive for COVID-19.

Ciric faced Arbi Emiev at Fair Fight XVI on February 12, 2022. He won the fight by unanimous decision. Ciric was next booked to face Mohamed Touchassie for the vacant Enfusion Welterweight World Championship at Enfusion 109 on June 18, 2022. He lost the fight by decision.

Ciric was expected to face Endy Semeleer in the main event of Glory Rivals 2 on September 17, 2022. He withdrew from the fight in August 29, after testing positive for COVID-19.

Ciric faced Jay Overmeer at Glory Rivals 3 on November 5, 2022. He lost the fight by unanimous decision.

Ciric faced Jos Van Belzen at Glory 83 on February 11, 2023. He won the fight by unanimous decision.

Titles and accomplishments
Amateur
 2015 IRO Dutch champion -79KG
 2015 IRO European champion -79KG

Professional
World Kickboxing Association 
WKA K-1 World -83kg Champion 
Enfusion
Enfusion World -80kg Champion

Professional kickboxing record

|- style="background:#cfc;"
|2023-02-11|| Win ||align=left| Jos Van Belzen || Glory 83 || Essen, Germany || Decision (Split) || 3 ||3:00 
|-
|- align="center" bgcolor="#fbb"
| 2022-11-05 || Loss||align=left| Jay Overmeer || Glory Rivals 3 || Amsterdam, Netherlands || Decision (Unanimous) || 3||3:00
|-
|- align="center" bgcolor="#fbb"
| 2022-06-18 || Loss||align=left| Mohamed Touchassie || Enfusion 109 || Groningen, Netherlands || Decision (Unanimous)	||5 ||3:00 
|-
! style=background:white colspan=9 |
|- align="center" bgcolor="#cfc"
| 2022-02-12 || Win ||align=left| Arbi Emiev || Fair Fight XVI || Yekaterinburg, Russia || Decision (Unanimous) || 3 || 3:00 
|-  bgcolor="#cfc"
| 2021-10-23 || Win ||align=left| Bilal Loukili || Enfusion 103 || Groningen, Netherlands || Decision (Split) || 3 || 3:00
|-  bgcolor="#cfc"
| 2020-09-19 || Win ||align=left| Jeroen van Diemen || Enfusion 97 || Alkmaar, Netherlands || Decision (Unanimous)  ||3  ||3:00
|-  bgcolor="#CCFFCC"
| 2019-12-14 || Win ||align=left| Samih Mimouni|| Fighters Glory || Drachten, Netherlands || KO  || 2 ||
|-  bgcolor="#CCFFCC"
| 2019-11-16 || Win||align=left| Giuseppe De Domenico || Enfusion 91 || Groningen, Netherlands || KO (Flying Knee) || 3 || 0:53
|-
! style=background:white colspan=9 |
|-  bgcolor="#CCFFCC"
| 2019-06-08 || Win ||align=left| Mbamba Cauwenbergh|| Enfusion 85 || Groningen, Netherlands || TKO  || 1 ||
|-  bgcolor="#CCFFCC"
| 2019-04-27 || Win ||align=left| Vladimír Moravčík || Enfusion 83 || Zilina, Slovakia || KO (Punches) || 4 || 0:35
|-
! style=background:white colspan=9 |
|-  bgcolor="#CCFFCC"
| 2019-02-23 || Win ||align=left| Jente Nnamadim || Enfusion 79 || Eindhoven, Netherlands || Ext.R Decision || 4 || 3:00
|-  bgcolor="#CCFFCC"
| 2018-12-07 || Win ||align=left| Taha Alami Marrouni || Enfusion 77 || Abu Dhabi, United Arab Emirates || Ext.R Decision || 4 || 3:00
|-  style="background:#CCFFCC;"
| 2018-11-17|| Win||align=left| Soufyan Assa || Enfusion 74 || Groningen, Netherlands || Decision || 3 || 3:00
|-  style="background:#CCFFCC;"
| 2018-09-20|| Win||align=left| Juri De Sousa || Enfusion 71 || Hamburg, Germany || Ext.R Decision || 4 || 3:00
|-  style="background:#FFBBBB;"
| 2018-06-23|| Loss||align=left| Lotfi Serghini || Enfusion 69 || Groningen, Netherlands || TKO (Punches) || 1 || 0:30
|-  style="background:#CCFFCC;"
| 2018-05-12|| Win||align=left| Mohamed El Moussaoui || Enfusion 67 || The Hague, Netherlands || KO || 2 ||
|-  style="background:#CCFFCC;"
| 2018-03-09|| Win||align=left| Marino Schouten || Enfusion Talents 47 || Abu Dhabi, United Arab Emirates || Decision || 3 || 3:00
|-  style="background:#CCFFCC;"
| 2017-11-18|| Win||align=left| Santino Verbeek || Enfusion 56 || Groningen, Netherlands || Ext.R Decision || 4 || 3:00
|-  style="background:#FFBBBB;"
| 2017-09-16|| Loss||align=left| Khalid El Bakouri || Enfusion Talents 36 || Groningen, Netherlands || KO || 2 ||
|-  style="background:#CCFFCC;"
| 2017-06-03|| Win||align=left| Ayoub Allach || Enfusion Talents 34 || Groningen, Netherlands || Decision || 3 || 3:00
|-  style="background:#FFBBBB;"
| 2017-03-25|| Loss||align=left| Chico Kwasi || North vs The Rest || Leek, Netherlands ||  ||  || 
|-  style="background:#CCFFCC;"
| 2017-02-04|| Win||align=left| Erwin vd Belt || Rumble Event || Beilen, Netherlands ||  Decision || 3 || 3:00
|-
| colspan=9 | Legend:

Personal life
He is of Serbian descent.

See also
List of male kickboxers

References

1997 births
Living people
Dutch male kickboxers
People from Drachten
Sportspeople from Friesland
Welterweight kickboxers
Dutch people of Serbian descent